Erechthias beeblebroxi is a moth of the  family Tineidae. It is endemic to Australia, where it has been recorded from Queensland.

The species was described in 1993 from individuals collected near Cooktown and Yeppoon in Queensland, Australia.
The wingspan is 13–14 mm for males and 11.5–12.5 mm for females. The forewings are white, speckled with ochreous brown and black scales in alternating longitudinal rows. The hindwings are pale grey-brown. Adults have been recorded on wing in October.

The name of the species is a reference to the fictional two-headed character Zaphod Beeblebrox in The Hitchhiker's Guide to the Galaxy: Erechthias beeblebroxi has markings that resemble a second head.

References

Moths described in 1993
Erechthiinae
Moths of Queensland
Endemic fauna of Australia
The Hitchhiker's Guide to the Galaxy